Dodger or Dodgers may refer to:

Sports teams

Baseball
Brooklyn Dodgers, a Major League Baseball team (1911–1957), relocated to Los Angeles
Cambridge Dodgers, a minor league affiliate
Nashua Dodgers, a farm club
Newport News Dodgers, a minor league affiliate
Greenwood Dodgers, an affiliate
Lamesa Dodgers, an affiliate
Newport Dodgers, an affiliate
Ponca City Dodgers, an affiliate
Thomasville Dodgers, an affiliate
Union City Dodgers, an affiliate
Los Angeles Dodgers, a Major League Baseball team (1958–present)
Arizona League Dodgers, an affiliate
Artesia Dodgers, a former affiliate
Dominican Summer Dodgers, an affiliate in the Dominican Summer League
Green Bay Dodgers, a former affiliate
Lethbridge Expos, known as the Lethbridge Dodgers while affiliated with the Los Angeles team
Medford Dodgers, a former affiliate
Odessa Dodgers, a former affiliate
Oklahoma City Dodgers, current Triple-A affiliate in the Pacific Coast League
Omaha Dodgers, a former affiliate
Orangeburg Dodgers, a former affiliate
Salisbury Dodgers a former affiliate
Vero Beach Devil Rays, formerly Dodgers, a former affiliate
Waterbury Dodgers, a former affiliate

Former minor league affiliates of both Major League teams:
Danville Dodgers
Kokomo Dodgers
Macon Dodgers
Pueblo Dodgers
Santa Barbara Dodgers

Other:
Hornell Dodgers, a collegiate summer team in the New York Collegiate Baseball League
Jamestown Dodgers, in the New York-Penn League (1966)
Kingston Dodgers, in the North Atlantic League (1947)
Leesburg Dodgers, in the Florida State League (1949)
Oshawa Dodgers, an independent minor league team based in Ontario, Canada (2002-2009)

Basketball
Brooklyn Dodgers (basketball), in the Eastern Basketball Association (1977-1978)

American football
Brooklyn Dodgers (AAFC), in the All-America Football Conference (1946-1948)
Brooklyn Dodgers (Continental Football League) (1966)
Brooklyn Dodgers (NFL) (1930-1943)

Hockey
Weston Dodgers, a defunct junior "A" hockey team in Ontario, Canada

Fictional characters
The Artful Dodger, in the 1838 Charles Dickens novel Oliver Twist
Dodger, the eponymous hero of the 2012 Terry Pratchett novel Dodger
Dodger, a dog in the Disney film Oliver & Company
Duck Dodgers, a cartoon parody of Buck Rogers and Flash Gordon, "played" by Daffy Duck
Roger the Dodger, in the British comic strip The Beano
Dodger Savage, from the British teen soap opera Hollyoaks

Personal nicknames
Dodger Whysall (1887–1930), English cricketer
"Dodger", an alias used by American video game designer and writer Michael Stout (born 1980)

Boats
USS Dodger II (SP-46), a United States Navy patrol boat
Dodger (sailing), a sailboat part

Other uses 
Dodger (novel), by Terry Pratchett
"Dodger" (Arrow), a television episode

See also
Draft dodger, someone who tries to avoid being drafted into the military
Dodger Dog, a hot dog named after the Los Angeles Dodgers
The Dodger Song, folk song
Artful Dodger (disambiguation)
Jammie Dodgers, a brand of biscuits